Ganyesa is a town of about 19,000 people in the North West province of South Africa.

It is an administrative centre for the far north-western area of the province, hosting the head offices of the Kagisano-Molopo Local Municipality, a magistrate's court and various national and provincial government offices.

The census of 2011 recorded the population of the town as 19,290 people, of whom the vast majority were black (98%) and Tswana-speaking (93%).

History
Ganyesa is the main town of the Barolong boo Mariba, a faction of the Barolong that split from the Kuruman community in about 1765 under Kgosi Motsware, and lived as pastoralists and hunters. In the late 19th century, competition with Kora traders for the Kalahari trade led to friction between the communities.

References

Populated places in the Kagisano-Molopo Local Municipality